Vera Alexeyevna Karalli (27 July 1889 – 16 November 1972) was a Russian ballet dancer, choreographer and silent film actress during the early years of the 20th century.

Early life and career

Born in Moscow, Karalli graduated from the Moscow Theatre School in 1906 under the direction of the prominent Russian instructor Alexander Gorsky. Karalli performed with Sergei Diaghilev's Ballets Russes company in 1909, as well as 1919 and 1920. She became a soloist at the Bolshoi Theatre after two years and became a ballerina in 1915. Karalli was frequently paired with danseur Mikhail Mordkin.

In 1914 Karalli also embarked on a successful acting career, and became one of Russia's first celebrated film actresses. Her first role was in the 1914 Pyotr Chardynin directed drama Ty pomnish' li? (English title: Do You Remember?) opposite the successful actor Ivan Mozzhukhin. From 1914 to 1919, Vera Karalli would appear in approximately sixteen Russian silent films, including the 1915 adaptation of Leo Tolstoy's War and Peace titled Voyna i mir. Her last film appearance was in a German dramatic release entitled Die Rache einer Frau (English title: A Woman's Revenge) in 1921. Often chosen as a leading lady by the notable director Yevgeni Bauer, Karalli is possibly best recalled for her performances in the Bauer directed adaptations of novelist Ivan Turgenev's Posle smerti (English: After Death) in 1915 and her role as Gizella in the 1917 melodrama Umirayushchii Lebed (The Dying Swan).

Rasputin's death
Karalli was a mistress of Grand Duke Dmitri Pavlovich of Russia and was reportedly also a co-conspirator in the December 1916 murder of Grigori Rasputin. She was allegedly one of two women present in the palace of Felix Yussupov on the night of Rasputin's murder. The other was Marianne Pistohlkors. Their alleged male co-conspirators never publicly identified the two women.

Exile
After fleeing to the West following the October Revolution, Karalli made her final film appearance in the 1921 Robert Wiene-directed German silent drama Die Rache einer Frau opposite Olga Engl and Franz Egenieff, credited as "Vera Caroly".

In 1920, Karalli participated in a large charity concert at the Paris Opéra along with opera singer and dancer Maria Nikolaevna Kuznetsova amongst others, to raise funds to aid impoverished fellow Russian émigrés.
  
In the 1920s, Vera Karalli taught dance in Kaunas, Lithuania and from 1930 until 1935 she was the ballet mistress of the Romanian Opera in the capital city of Bucharest. From 1938 until 1941 Karalli lived in Paris, France. Later, she settled in Vienna, Austria and taught ballet there. Karalli died in Baden, Austria in 1972. She was interred at the Vienna Central Cemetery.

Filmography
Ты помнишь ли? (Ty pomnish' li?) (1914)
Сорванец (Sorvanets) (1914)
Chrysanthemums (1914)
After Death (1915)
War and Peace (1915)
Наташа Ростова (Natasha Rostova) (1915)
Тени греха (Teni grekha) (1915)
Обожжённые крылья (Obozhzhenniye krylya) (1915)
Любовь статского советника (Lyubov statskogo sovetnika) (1915)
Счастье вечной ночи (Schastye vechnoy nochi) (1915)
Драконовский контракт (Drakonovskiy kontrakt) (1915)
Гриф старого борца (Grif starogo bortsa) (1916)
The King of Paris (1917)
The Dying Swan (1917)
Набат (Nabat) (1917)
Мечта и жизнь (Mechta i zhizn) (1918)
La Nuit du 11 septembre (1919)
A Woman's Revenge (1921)

See also
List of Russian ballet dancers

References

External links

The Ballerina Gallery
Andros On Ballet
Danish Ballet Journal

1889 births
1972 deaths
Ballets Russes dancers
Russian ballerinas
Russian silent film actresses
20th-century Russian actresses
20th-century Russian ballet dancers
Actresses from Moscow
Mistresses of Russian royalty
White Russian emigrants to Lithuania
White Russian emigrants to France
White Russian emigrants to Austria
White Russian emigrants to Romania